Sinodorcadion is a genus of longhorn beetles of the subfamily Lamiinae, containing the following species:

 Sinodorcadion jiangi Xie, Shi & Wang, 2013
 Sinodorcadion magnispinicolle Xie, Shi & Wang, 2013
 Sinodorcadion punctulatum Gressitt, 1939
 Sinodorcadion punctuscapum Xie, Shi & Wang, 2013
 Sinodorcadion subspinicolle Breuning, 1959

References

Morimopsini